The C IV was a steam locomotive, built for goods train duties, that was manufactured between 1884 and 1897 for the Royal Bavarian State Railways (Königlich Bayerische Staatsbahn).

Description 
Between 1884 and 1893 a total of 87 units two-cylinder, saturated steam engines were delivered. They were followed by two compound engines in 1889 for testing and then 98 more compounds from 1892 to 1897. The locomotives, which for the first time did not have the external frames typical in Bavaria up to that time, were soon no longer equal to the growing demands made on them. In spite of that, many were taken over by the Deutsche Reichsbahn, designated as Class 53.80-81 and allocated the operating numbers 53 8011 to 8064 and 53 8081 to 8168. The two-cylinder engines were equipped with a Bavarian Class 3 T 10.2 tender; they were all retired by 1926. The compound variants had a Class 3 T 10.5 tender; they were taken out of service by 1931.

See also 
 Royal Bavarian State Railways
 List of Bavarian locomotives and railbuses

References

External links 
 Railways of Germany forum

0-6-0 locomotives
C IV
Standard gauge locomotives of Germany
Maffei locomotives
Krauss locomotives
Railway locomotives introduced in 1884
C n2 locomotives
C n2v locomotives
Freight locomotives